Vanessa Giunchi (born 7 June 1980 in Milan) is an Italian former competitive figure skater. She is a two-time (1995, 2001) Italian national champion and represented Italy at the 2002 Winter Olympics in Salt Lake City, Utah.

Early in her career, she was coached by Carlo Fassi.

Programs

Results
GP = Grand Prix; JGP = Junior Grand Prix (ISU Junior Series)

References

External links
 

Italian female single skaters
Figure skaters at the 2002 Winter Olympics
Olympic figure skaters of Italy
1980 births
Figure skaters from Milan
Living people